Pro-Ject Audio Systems is a manufacturer of audiophile equipment, founded in 1991 by Heinz Lichtenegger and located in Mistelbach, Austria. Pro-Ject Audio Systems designs the products in Austria and produces them in Europe (the manufacturing plants are in Germany, Czech Republic and Slovakia). It produces a range of audio equipment including a family of turntables, which are often quoted as reference entry-level models. Pro-Ject Audio System also manufactures a range of micro hi-fi components such as Amps, CD Transports, Phono Stages, Streaming Devices, Loudspeakers and more. Today, Pro-Ject Audio Systems ship into more than 80 countries world-wide. Since 2015 Pro-Ject has released limited edition turntables in cooperation with the Beatles, The Rolling Stones, Metallica, Hans Theessink, Parov Stelar, and the Vienna Philharmonic. 

Pro-Ject Audio Systems is a division of Audio Tuning, that also owns Musical Fidelity, Rekkord Audio and TONE Factory.

Popular Turntables 
The Debut Line are entry-level to mid-range turntables designed for vinyl enthusiasts. These turntables are known for their high-quality sound, affordability, and ease of use. They come in a variety of colors and feature a belt-driven design, which helps reduce noise and vibrations that can impact sound quality. Some models come with built-in phono preamps, which allow them to be connected directly to powered speakers or other amplifiers without the need for a separate phono preamp.

See also
 List of phonograph manufacturers

References

External links

Electronics companies established in 1991
Headphone amplifier manufacturers
Austrian brands
Phonograph manufacturers
Audio equipment manufacturers of Austria
Economy of Lower Austria
Austrian companies established in 1991